Tatiana Sergeyevna Kosheleva (born 23 December 1988) is a Russian volleyball player. She was a member of the Russia women's national volleyball team that won the gold medal at the 2010 World Championship, the 2013 European Championship and the 2015 European Championship.

Career

Club
At club level, she played for Dinamo Moscow, Zarechie Odintsovo, Dinamo Kazan and Dinamo Krasnodar before joining Eczacıbaşı VitrA in 2016.

Kosheleva led Dinamo Krasnodar with 37 points in the final match to win the 2014–15 CEV Cup gold medal and the Most Valuable Player award. She scored 245 points leading all scorers in the six 2014/15 European Cups. Her team earned a wild card from the FIVB to play the 2015 FIVB Club World Championship, the club reached the final of the tournament and eventually lost the Turkish side Eczacibasi VitrA. She was awarded Best Outside Spiker.

Galatasaray (return)
On 20 October 2020, Galatasaray HDI Sigorta reintroduced former player Kosheleva. She will fight with the number 14 jersey in the 2020–21 season.

National
As a member of the Russia women's national volleyball team, she participated in many competitions including the 2010 Montreux Volley Masters, the FIVB Volleyball World Grand Prix (in 2007, 2009, 2011, 2013, 2014, 2015, 2016), the European Championships (in 2007, 2009, 2013, 2015), the World Championships (in 2010, 2014), the 2015 FIVB Volleyball Women's World Cup in Japan, and the Olympic Games of London 2012 and Rio 2016.

She was won the Best Spiker award of the 2010 World Championship. Besides the gold medal won at the 2013 European Championship, she was awarded the Most Valuable Player of the event. Two years later at the 2015 European Championship, she got one better by winning the championship, the Most Valuable Player award and the Best Outside Spiker award.

Awards

Individuals
 2009 FIVB World Grand Prix "Best Spiker"
 2010 Montreux Volley Masters "Best Spiker"
 2010 World Championship "Best Spiker"
 2013 European Championship "Most Valuable Player"
 2013-14 Russian Cup "Most Valuable Player"
 2014–15 CEV Cup "Most Valuable Player"
 2015 FIVB Club World Championship "Best Outside Spiker"
 2015 FIVB Women's World Cup "Best Outside Spiker"
 2015 European Championship "Best Outside Spikers"
 2015 European Championship "Most Valuable Player"
 2016 FIVB Club World Championship "Best Outside Spiker"

National team

Junior
 2005 FIVB Volleyball Girls' U18 World Championship –  Silver medal

Senior
 2007 European Championship –  Bronze medal
 2008 Boris Yeltsin Cup –  Gold medal
 2009 Boris Yeltsin Cup –  Gold medal
 2009 FIVB World Grand Prix –  Silver medal
 2010 Boris Yeltsin Cup –  Gold medal
 2010 FIVB World Championship –  Gold medal
 2013 European Championship –  Gold medal
 2014 FIVB World Grand Prix –  Bronze medal
 2015 FIVB World Grand Prix –  Silver medal
 2015 European Championship –  Gold medal

Clubs
 2007 Russian Cup –  Gold medal, with Zarechie Odintsovo
 2007–08 CEV Champions League –  Silver medal, with Zarechie Odintsovo
 2007–08 Russian Championship –  Gold medal, with Zarechie Odintsovo
 2008–09 Russian Championship –  Silver medal, with Zarechie Odintsovo
 2009 Russian Cup –  Silver medal, with Zarechie Odintsovo
 2009–10 Russian Championship –  Gold medal, with Zarechie Odintsovo
 2010 Russian Cup –  Gold medal, with Dinamo Kazan
 2010–11 Russian Championship –  Gold medal, with Dinamo Kazan
 2012–13 Russian Championship –  Silver medal, with Dinamo Moscow
 2013 Russian Cup –  Gold medal, with Dinamo Moscow
 2013–14 Russian Championship –  Silver medal, with Dinamo Moscow
 2014 Russian Cup –  Gold medal, with Dinamo Krasnodar
 2014–15 CEV Cup –  Gold medal, with Dinamo Krasnodar
 2015 Russian Cup –  Gold medal, with Dinamo Krasnodar
 2015 FIVB Club World Championship –  Silver medal, with Dinamo Krasnodar
 2015–16 CEV Cup –  Gold medal, with Dinamo Krasnodar
 2016 FIVB Club World Championship –  Gold medal, with Eczacıbaşı VitrA

References

External links
Profile at CEV
Profile  at Volleyball Club Dinamo Krasnodar
Profile at Volleyball club Dinamo-Kazan

1988 births
Living people
Sportspeople from Minsk
Russian women's volleyball players
Olympic volleyball players of Russia
Volleyball players at the 2012 Summer Olympics
Volleyball players at the 2016 Summer Olympics
Expatriate volleyball players in Turkey
Eczacıbaşı volleyball players
Galatasaray S.K. (women's volleyball) players
20th-century Russian women
21st-century Russian women